Moonee Ponds railway station is located on the Craigieburn line in Victoria, Australia. It serves the northern Melbourne suburb of Moonee Ponds, and it opened on 1 November 1860.

History

Moonee Ponds station opened on 1 November 1860, just over a week after the railway line opened as part of the private Melbourne and Essendon Railway Company line to Essendon. The station closed with the line on 1 July 1864, but was reopened on 9 October 1871, under government ownership. Like the suburb itself, the station is believed to have gotten its name from either the Moonee Ponds Creek, which resembled a chain of ponds in dry weather (the creek was noted as 'Mone Mone Creek' in 1837 by government surveyor Robert Hoddle, during a survey of the area), an Indigenous Australian who was attached to the mounted police, or John Moonee, who had land near the present day Moonee Valley Racecourse.

In 1882, the station building on Platform 1 was provided, with a signal box provided in 1889, to control interlocked gates at the Puckle Street level crossing, until they were replaced with boom barriers in 1969.

On 4 May 2010, as part of the 2010/2011 State Budget, $83.7 million was allocated to upgrade Moonee Ponds to a Premium Station, along with nineteen others. However, in March 2011, this was scrapped by the Baillieu Government.

Platforms and services

Moonee Ponds has two side platforms. It is serviced by Metro Trains' Craigieburn line services.

Platform 1:
  all stations services to Flinders Street

Platform 2:
  all stations services to Craigieburn

Transport links

Ryan Brothers Bus Service operates one route to and from Moonee Ponds station, under contract to Public Transport Victoria:
 : to Aberfeldie

Moonee Ponds Junction is located 400 metres east of the station, and is the terminus for routes operated by CDC Melbourne, Dysons, Kastoria Bus Lines, Moonee Valley Coaches and Transit Systems Victoria.

Gallery

References

External links

 Melway map at street-directory.com.au

Railway stations in Melbourne
Railway stations in Australia opened in 1860
Railway stations in the City of Moonee Valley